Alegría Bendayán de Bendelac (April 19, 1928  – April 5, 2020) was a Venezuelan philologist, professor, writer and Jewish poet. During her career she was dedicated to studying sephardic culture, especially the Judeo-Spanish language of northern Morocco. She was professor of French at the University of Pennsylvania and published several works about sephardic traditions.

Biography 
Alegría Bendayán de Bendelac is the fourth of five siblings, daughter of Moroccan immigrants from Tétouan who arrived at Villa de Cura, Aragua state. Her parents were Abraham Bendayan and Rachel Cohen of Bendayan. Soon their parents settled in Caracas. She married Rafael Bendelac on June 24, 1953. The couple had two daughters, Mercedes and Lisa.

In 1963 she emigrated to New York, where she worked as a French teacher in various schools. Subsequently, she graduated in French at Columbia University and then obtained a PhD in French Literature at the same university. After graduating, she began teaching at Fordham University and later joined Penn State University. Among her works are dictionaries and historical investigations of Sephardic language and traditions, she was also dedicated to writing poetry. 

She died of natural causes at the age of 91 in Kew Gardens, NY.

Works 
 Diccionario del Judeoespañol de Los Sefardíes del Norte de Marruecos (1995)
 Voces Jaquetiescas (1990)
 Los Nuestros. Sejiná, Letuarios, Jaquetía y Fraja. Un retrato de los sefardíes del Norte de Marruecos a través de sus recuerdos y su lengua (1860-1984) (1987)
 Structures du rêve et de la realité dans Sylvie (1975)
 Typical Sephardic weddings in Tangier, Morocco (c.1930-c.1950) (1986)
 Tourmaline II (1973)
 Mosaique: Une enfance juive a Tanger (1930-1945) (1992)

References 

Venezuelan women scientists
Venezuelan women writers
Writers from Caracas
Venezuelan philologists
Women philologists
Venezuelan Sephardi Jews
1928 births
Venezuelan people of Moroccan-Jewish descent
2020 deaths
University of Pennsylvania faculty
Columbia University alumni
Fordham University faculty
Venezuelan expatriates in the United States
Sephardi Jewish culture
Venezuelan women educators
Judaeo-Spanish